The 13th CARIFTA Games was held in Nassau, Bahamas on April 21–23, 1984.

Participation (unofficial)

For the 1984 CARIFTA Games only the medalists can be found on the "World Junior Athletics History" website. An unofficial count yields the number of about 104 medalists (60 junior (under-20) and 44 youth (under-17)) from about 10 countries: Antigua and Barbuda (1), Bahamas (35), Barbados (13), Bermuda (5), Cayman Islands (3), Jamaica (29), Martinique (5), Netherlands Antilles (1), Suriname (1), Trinidad and Tobago (11).

Austin Sealy Award

The Austin Sealy Trophy for the most outstanding athlete of the games was awarded to Pauline Davis from the Bahamas.  She won 2 gold medals (100m, and 200m) in the junior (U-20) category.  In addition, she was probably part of at least one of the medal winning relay teams (there is no information on the team members).

Medal summary
Medal winners are published by category: Boys under 20 (Junior), Girls under 20 (Junior), Boys under 17 (Youth), and Girls under 17 (Youth).
The medalists can also be found on the "World Junior Athletics History" website.

Boys under 20 (Junior)

Girls under 20 (Junior)

Boys under 17 (Youth)

Girls under 17 (Youth)

Medal table (unofficial)

References

External links
World Junior Athletics History

CARIFTA Games
International athletics competitions hosted by the Bahamas
CARIFTA Games
CARIFTA Games
CARIFTA Games